Agustín Acosta (1886-1979) was a Cuban poet and politician. He was born and raised in Matanzas. As a young man, he worked as a telegraph operator for a Cuban railroad. He studied law at Havana University; upon graduating in 1918, he became a notary and practised his trade in Jagüey Grande in Matanzas. He was active politically and spent long stretches in prison during the regime of Gerardo Machado. After the fall of Machado, he served as provisional governor of Matanzas from 1933 to 1934. He also held other important political offices, such as cabinet secretary to Carlos Mendieta, and president of the Partido Unión Nacionalista (1936-1937).

As a poet, his writing was marked by nationalist ideals pitted against US hegemony over the island. He wrote regularly for Cuban publications such as El Fígaro, El Cubano Libre, Socialand Carteles, etc. His notable poetry collections are: 
 La Zafra (1926)
 Los camellos distantes (1936)
 Las islas desoladas (1943)
 Caminos de hierro (1963)

Some of his popular poems like "Las carretas en la noche" ("Carts in the Night") and "Mediodia en el Campo" ("Midday in the Country") appeared in La Zafra. He also wrote a number of essays on Jose Marti. He left Cuba in 1972-73 and died in Miami in 1979.

References

Cuban politicians